The 1984 Women's Olympic Volleyball Tournament was the 6th edition of the event, organized by the world's governing body, the FIVB in conjunction with the IOC. It was held in Long Beach, California, United States from July 30 to August 7, 1984.

Qualification

* Notes:
1. Cuba was the 1983 NORCECA Championship runners-up (champions United States, were already qualified as hosts), but together with East Germany (1983 European champion), Soviet Union (1980 Olympic champion) and other countries, boycotted the games.
2. Canada, South Korea and West Germany replaced Cuba, East Germany and the Soviet Union.
3. Brazil was invited.

Format
The tournament was played in two different stages. A single round-robin format was played within each pool to determine the teams position in the pool. The  (second stage) was played in a single elimination format, where the preliminary round two highest ranked teams in each group advanced to the semifinals and the two lowest ranked teams advanced to the 5th–8th place semifinals.

Pools composition

Squads

Venues
Long Beach Arena, Long Beach, California, United States

Preliminary round

Group A

|}

|}

Group B

|}

|}

Final round

5th to 8th place

5th–8th place semifinals

|}

7th place match

|}

5th place match

|}

Final

Semifinals

|}

Bronze medal match

|}

Gold medal match

|}

Final standing

Medalists

Awards

Most Valuable Player
 
Best Scorer
 
Best Spiker
 

Best Blocker
 
Best Receiver
 
Best Server

See Also
 My People, My Country (Movie): the background of the second scene is this tournament. 
 Leap (Movie)

References

External links
Volleyball
Final standings (1964-2000) at FIVB.org
Official results (pgs. 591-599)

O
1984
1984 in women's volleyball
Women's volleyball in the United States
Vol
Women's sports in California